Fight Club is a 1999 film directed by David Fincher.

Fight Club may also refer to:

 Fight Club (novel), a 1996 novel by Chuck Palahniuk on which Fincher's film is based
 Fight Club (video game), a 2004 video game based on the film
 Fight Club – Members Only, a 2006 Indian film
 "Fight Club" (The X-Files), a 2000 episode of The X-Files
 Eurosport Fight Club, a sport program broadcast by Eurosport
 "Fight Club", a song by Violent J from The Shining
 Fight Club DC, a defunct skatepark in Washington, D.C., US
 AMA Fight Club, a mixed martial arts training facility in New Jersey, US
The Fight Club, a Canadian MMA promoter

See also
 Fight Klub, a trading-card game
 Mahjong Fight Club, a video game released by Konami, followed by several sequels